Pensaskari is an island of the Haparanda archipelago in Sweden. The island is located south of Vasikkasaari. It has no shore connection and has no buildings.

References 

Swedish islands in the Baltic
Islands of Norrbotten County